Ruschel is a surname. Notable people with the surname include:

Alan Ruschel (born 1989), Brazilian footballer
Alberto Ruschel (1918–1996), Brazilian actor, producer, and director
Livonir Ruschel (born 1979), Brazilian footballer

See also
Rischel